The Anderson-Abruzzo Albuquerque International Balloon Museum is a museum dedicated to the worldwide history, science, and art of all types of ballooning and lighter-than-air flight. It is located in Albuquerque, New Mexico, USA, and is situated just outside the grounds used for the Albuquerque International Balloon Fiesta, the world's largest yearly balloon fiesta, and is named for Ben Abruzzo and Maxie Anderson, two Albuquerque natives who established several ballooning firsts, such as crossing the Atlantic Ocean and continents.

Ben Abruzzo and Maxie Anderson most notably crewed the Double Eagle II balloon in 1978, the first gas balloon to complete a transatlantic flight. Abruzzo and Anderson stretched the limits of ballooning and air travel until their untimely passings in 1983, and are honored for their excellence and history with ballooning here in Albuquerque.

Opened on October 1, 2005, it is owned by the city of Albuquerque and is a collaborative project of the Anderson-Abruzzo International Balloon Museum Foundation, a 501(c)(3) tax exempt not-for-profit corporation, and the City of Albuquerque's Cultural Services Division.  It is a  facility with class rooms, conference rooms, and many exhibits on the history of ballooning, including items from famous balloonists such as Ed Yost, Joseph Kittinger, and Ben Abruzzo.

Attractions

Museum exhibits include artifacts and materials related to the history of ballooning and the science behind ballooning. Modern multimedia systems such as a balloon flight simulator provide both education and entertainment. The recently opened movie theater provides both 2D and 4D films.

Several notable displays include Women's Contribution to the History of Ballooning, Sid Cutter's influence on the Albuquerque Ballooning Industry, and a Troy Bradley Pilot Spotlight for his significant experience flying and numerous awards.

Building design and construction
The museum, designed by the architectural firm Gerald A. Martin, Ltd., is a partial two-story high bay building. The high bay, which is the main gallery, is 80 feet tall with a tensile fabric roof. The interior ceiling is 75 feet high.

Construction of the museum was completed in November 2004 at a cost of $10.4 million. Framing is chiefly steel with some concrete supports. The structural engineer of record was Chavez-Grieves Consulting Engineers.

Tim Anderson 4-D Theater
In 2006, the Balloon Museum planned to add a new 4-D movie theater. To pay for the equipment, the museum obtained a sizable grant from the State of New Mexico. The money, some $1.7 million, was distributed by then-governor Bill Richardson without oversight or review. The museum used a million dollars to buy the video equipment, which was delivered in 2008. Unfortunately a 2009 feasibility study showed that the equipment was too big to fit into the building, and that the engineering challenges related to installing the equipment would not be more expensive than expected. However the theater was completed and opened in 2016.

See also
List of U.S. Ballooning Hall of Fame Inductees

References

Ballooning museums
Aerospace museums in New Mexico
Museums in Albuquerque, New Mexico
Museums established in 2005
2005 establishments in New Mexico
Non-profit organizations based in the United States